Working Group of Young Socialists in the SPD (Jusos) is a volunteer youth organization of the Social Democratic Party of Germany (SPD).

As of 2021, there are over 70,000 official Juso members.

Membership 

Every member of the SPD who is aged between 14 and 35 years old is automatically enrolled in the Jusos. Since 1994, people in that age group have been able to become a Juso member without party membership. Until 2011 membership was free, but ended after a two 2-year period. There is now a membership fee of €1 per month. It is only possible to be a member of the Jusos until you reach your 35th birthday.

History

1918–1969 
The main speaker was the spokesman for the Magdeburg young workers, 19-year-old Erich Ollenhauer, who identified the founding of the republic as a necessary condition for the young workers' movement to gain strength. Here, the later party song of the SPD, was presented to the participants. Overall, the Workers' Youth Day took a positive stance on the policies of the mother party M-SPD.

The Jusos were founded between 1918 and 1920, when groups of members of the SPD between 20 and 25 years of age began to meet. In terms of numbers, the Jusos remained small, with between 3,000 and 5,000 members. They were dissolved in 1931 as a result of an internal controversy.

After the end of World War II, the Jusos were reestablished in 1946. In their early years, they were a relatively indistinctive wing of the Social Democratic Party.

Move to the left in 1969 
In 1969, the Jusos moved to the left of their parent party. On their  (Federal Congress) they decided to become a left-wing political federation in their own right instead of being simply an extension of the SPD. The congress began with the scandal that the delegates booed the SPD national director Hans-Jürgen Wischnewski, who had come as a guest, and described him as incompetent and his planned presentation was voted off the agenda. Chairman of Jusos Peter Corterier's statement of accounts was also voted off the agenda, and he then offered his immediate resignation, which the Congress declined. Since then, the Jusos have seen themselves as a socialist and feminist association within the SPD.

In the same year, the party executive decided that the Juso federal secretary should be subject to the instructions of the Juso federal executive.

References

Bibliography

External links 

 Official homepage of Jusos 

Youth wings of political parties in Germany
Youth wings of social democratic parties
Social Democratic Party of Germany